Acacia setulifera is a shrub of the genus Acacia and the subgenus Plurinerves that is endemic to an area of northern Australia.

Description
It can have a rounded and often procumbent habit with glabrous and resinous branchlets the are apically angular that have coarse ridges. Like most species of Acacia it has phyllodes rather than true leaves. The phyllodes have an elliptic or ovate shape and are often slightly
It flowers throughout the year producing spherical flower-heads with a diameter of  containing 15 to 26 bright yellow coloured flowers.

Distribution
It is native to an area in the Northern Territory and the Kimberley region of Western Australia. The range of the plant extends around south of Kununurra in the Carr Boyd Range in the eastern Kimberley as well as in the Victoria River district in the top end of the Northern Territory where it is commonly situated on and around sandstone escarpments or ridges as a part of open Eucalyptus or Terminalia woodland communities.

See also
 List of Acacia species

References

setulifera
Acacias of Western Australia
Flora of the Northern Territory
Taxa named by George Bentham
Plants described in 1855